William M. Staub is a Canadian retired ice hockey left winger who was an All-American for Denver.

Career
Staub joined the varsity team at Denver in 1961, after the program had won consecutive national championships. A great many players had left after the 1961 title and the team regressed slightly in Staub's first season. Denver finished third in the WCHA tournament and missed out on the NCAA Tournament. The following season, Murray Armstrong's team rebounded and finished atop the conference with Staub leading the club in scoring. He was named an All-American and a All-WCHA First Teamer and helped the Pioneers capture the conference championship. Denver made the championship game that season, however, the team could not overcome a huge first period by North Dakota and fell 5–6.

For his senior season, Staub was named team co-captain and led the team to a second-place finish in the WCHA. The Pioneers upset top-seeded Michigan and earned the #1 spot for the NCAA Tournament. After defeating Rensselaer in the semifinal, Denver and Michigan met for a rematch in the title game and this time the Wolverines came out on top. Despite failing to score in the final match, Staub was named to the All-Tournament First Team.

After graduating, Staub continued his playing career. He started with a season of senior hockey and led the Jacksonville Rockets in scoring. After that strong showing he joined the Houston Apollos, a minor professional team and ended up playing in the American Hockey League over parts of two seasons. Staub, however, couldn't keep up his scoring numbers in the AHL and transferred to the IHL in 1968. He spent six seasons in the second-tier minor league, winning a Turner Cup with the Dayton Gems in 1970. He retired in 1976 after a short stint with the Greensboro Generals.

Career statistics

Regular season and playoffs

Awards and honors

References

External links

1941 births
Living people
Canadian ice hockey centres
Ice hockey people from Winnipeg
Denver Pioneers men's ice hockey players
Jacksonville Rockets players
Providence Reds players
Houston Apollos players
Quebec Aces (AHL) players
Columbus Checkers players
Fort Wayne Komets players
Dayton Gems players
Toledo Hornets players
Greensboro Generals (EHL) players
AHCA Division I men's ice hockey All-Americans